Ovcha Kupel II is a Sofia Metro station on the M3 line. It was opened on 24 April 2021 as part of the second section of the line between Ovcha kupel and Gorna Banya. The preceding station is Gorna Banya and the adjacent station is Moesia.

Location 
The station is located near the intersection between Centralna street and Zhyul Losho street, near Doverie Hospital.

References 

Sofia Metro stations
2021 establishments in Bulgaria
Railway stations opened in 2021